Namhkai (also known as Nanke) was a Shan state in the Myelat region of what is today Burma. Its capital was Paw-in. Its population was almost entirely Pa-O.

References

Shan States